A metronome is a device that produces an audible click or other sound at a regular interval that can be set by the user, typically in beats per minute (BPM). Metronomes may include synchronized visual motion. Musicians use the device to practise playing to a regular pulse.

A kind of metronome was among the inventions of Andalusian polymath Abbas ibn Firnas (810–887). In 1815,  German inventor Johann Maelzel patented his mechanical, wind-up metronome as a tool for musicians, under the title "Instrument/Machine for the Improvement of all Musical Performance, called Metronome". In the 20th century, electronic metronomes and software metronomes were invented.

Musicians practise with metronomes to improve their timing, especially the ability to stick to a regular tempo. Metronome practice helps internalize a clear sense of timing and tempo. Composers and conductors often use a metronome as a standard tempo reference—and may play, sing, or conduct to the metronome. The metronome is used by composers to derive beats per minute if they want to indicate that in a composition. Conductors use a metronome to note their preferred tempo in each section.

When interpreting emotion and other qualities in music, performers seldom play exactly on every beat; expressive, flexible rubato may be used at times. Typically, every beat of a musically expressive performance does not align exactly with each click of a metronome. This has led some musicians to criticize use of a metronome, because metronome time is different from musical time.

Etymology
The word metronome first appeared in English in 1815, and is Greek in origin, derived from metron—"measure" and nomos—"regulating, law". The patent registered by Maelzel in London refers to the instrument as "metronome or musical time-keeper".

History

According to Lynn Townsend White Jr., Andalusian inventor Abbas Ibn Firnas invented an early metronome.

Galileo Galilei first studied and discovered concepts involving the pendulum in the late 16th and early 17th centuries. In 1696, Etienne Loulié first successfully used an adjustable pendulum to make the first mechanical metronome—however, his design produced no sound, and did not have an escapement to keep the pendulum in motion. To get the correct pulse with this kind of visual device, the musician watches the pendulum as if watching a conductor's baton.

The more familiar mechanical musical chronometer was invented by Dietrich Nikolaus Winkel in Amsterdam in 1814. Through questionable practice, Johann Maelzel, incorporating Winkel's ideas, added a scale, called it a metronome and started manufacturing the metronome under his own name in 1816: "Maelzel's Metronome." The original text of Maelzel's patent in England (1815) can be downloaded.

Ludwig van Beethoven was perhaps the first notable composer to indicate specific metronome markings in his music. This was done in 1815, with the corrected copy of the score of the Cantata op. 112 containing Beethoven's first metronome mark.

Usage
Musicians practise playing to metronomes to develop and maintain a sense of timing and tempo. Metronomes are also used as a training tool to increase performance speed. Tempo is almost always measured in beats per minute (BPM). Even pieces that do not require a strictly constant tempo (such as with rubato) sometimes provide a BPM marking to indicate the general tempo.

A tempo marking is a term that conveys a narrow range of tempos and an associated character. For example, the term "Vivace" can indicate a tempo between 156 and 176 BPM, but it also communicates that the music should be played with a lively character. Metronomes will often include both BPM and tempo markings.

A hardware (non-software/non-app based) metronome's tempo typically is adjustable from 40 to 208 BPM. The most common arrangement of tempos on a Maelzel metronome begins with at 40 beats per minute

and increases by 2s:

40
42
44
46
48
50
52
54
56
58
60

then by 3s:
63
66
69
72

then by 4s:
72
76
80
84
88
92
96
100
104
108
112
116
120

then by 6s:
126
132
138
144

then by 8s:
144
152
160
168
176
184
192
200
208.
Some digital metronomes allow adjustment to more precise tempos (e.g. increasing 120 to 121), but such a difference is hardly perceptible.

Another mark that denotes tempo is M.M. (or MM), or Mälzel's Metronome.

Specific uses include learning to play tempos and beats consistently—for example, one fighting a tendency to speed up might play a phrase repeatedly while slightly slowing the BPM setting each time (to play more steadily)—and practising technique by setting the metronome progressively to higher speeds until the desired speed is achieved. This also helps to expose slow-downs due to technical challenges. Additionally, recording musicians use click tracks from metronomes to help audio engineers synchronize audio tracks.

In research, metronomes can be used to maintain desired cadences in different physiological laboratory-based tests.

Types of metronomes

Mechanical metronomes
A mechanical metronome uses an adjustable weight on the end of an inverted pendulum rod to control tempo. The weight slides up the pendulum rod to decrease tempo, or down to increase tempo. (This mechanism is also called a double-weighted pendulum, because there is a second, fixed weight on the other side of the pendulum pivot, inside the metronome case.) The pendulum swings back and forth in tempo, while a mechanism inside the metronome produces a clicking sound with each oscillation. Mechanical metronomes do not need a battery, but run from a spring-wound clockwork escapement.

Electromechanical metronomes
Electromechanical metronomes were invented by Franz Frederick. Instead of using a clockwork or a quartz crystal, an electric motor is used to generate power for the mechanism. Most use a mechanical variable-speed drive combination with a momentary switch and a cam wheel to time the beats. Franz and Yamaha were common manufacturers in the 1960s and 1970s, such as the Franz LB4. A common optional feature was a neon lamp which lights up in time with the beat. Very few electromechanical metronomes provide time signature chimes in addition to the basic tempo.

Electronic metronomes

Most modern metronomes are electronic and use a quartz crystal to maintain accuracy, comparable to those used in wristwatches. The simplest electronic metronomes have a dial or buttons to control the tempo; some also produce tuning notes, usually around the range of A440 (440 hertz). Sophisticated metronomes can produce two or more distinct sounds. Tones can differ in pitch, volume, and/or timbre to demarcate downbeats from other beats, as well as compound and complex time signatures.

Many electronic musical keyboards have built-in metronome functions.

Software metronomes
Software metronomes run either as standalone applications on computers and smartphones, or in music sequencing and audio multitrack software packages. In recording studio applications, such as film scoring, a software metronome may provide a click track to synchronize musicians.

Metronome applications and click tracks
Users of iPods and other portable MP3 players can use prerecorded MP3 metronome click tracks, which can use different sounds and samples instead of the usual metronome beep. Users of smartphones can install a wide range of metronome applications. The Google search engine includes an interactive metronome that can play between 40 and 218 BPM. Either method avoids the need to bring a physical metronome along to lessons or practice sessions.

Use of the metronome as an instrument
Perhaps the most famous, and most direct, use of the metronome as an instrument is György Ligeti's 1962 composition, Poème Symphonique for 100 metronomes. Two years earlier, Toshi Ichiyanagi wrote Music for Electric Metronomes. Maurice Ravel used three metronomes at different speeds for the opening of his opera L'heure espagnole (1911).

The clicking sounds of mechanical metronomes have sometimes been used to provide a soft rhythm track without using any of the usual percussion instruments. Paul McCartney did this on "Distractions" (Flowers in the Dirt). Following the metronome, McCartney performed a rhythm track by hitting various parts of his body. Also, in Ennio Morricone's theme "Farewell to Cheyenne" (featured on Once Upon a Time in the West), the steady clip-clop beat is provided by the deliberately distorted and slowed-down sound of a mechanical metronome.

William Kentridge's "The Refusal of Time" (2012) features five metronomes in the video installation.

Reception

Positive views 
The metronome is usually positively viewed by performers, musicologists (who spend considerable time analysing metronome markings), teachers, and conservatories. It is considered an excellent practice tool because of its steady beat, being "mathematically perfect and categorically correct". This removes guesswork and aids musicians in various ways, including keeping tempos, countering tendencies to slow down or speed up, and increasing evenness and accuracy, especially in rapid passages. Metronomes are thus commonly used at all skill levels—both by students and professional musicians. Likewise, the use of the metronome is valued in learning various genres with various tempos, but may not be sufficient for more complex rhythms. Nevertheless, the steady tempo (that helps identifying when one is playing offbeat) is hailed as an invaluable resource; in his doctoral thesis, Aaron M. Farrell described the metronome as a "perfect chamber music partner". As a result, metronomes are often recommended to music students without reservation.

Various quotations in favour of the metronome can be found in the book Metronome Techniques: Potpourri of quotations.

Strict rhythm: modern performance practice
The metronome has been very important in performance practice, and largely unquestioned in musical pedagogy or scholarship, since the 20th century. Author Miles Hoffman said that "most music teachers consider the metronome indispensable, and most professional musicians, in fact, continue to practice with a metronome throughout their careers".

Author Bruce Haynes describes the role of the metronome in modern style in detail in his book The end of early music, for metronomic practice is now common worldwide. He emphasizes that modern style is much more rhythmically rigid, in that tempo is steady and scores are read very literally, sometimes perceived as devoid of emotion in contrast to the rubato and bluster characteristic of Romantic music. Because of this, American musicologist and critic Richard Taruskin calls Modernism "refuge in order and precision, hostility to subjectivity, to the vagaries of personality," noting its order and precision. These qualities give rise to the term metronomic, which critics use to describe more modern music with an unyielding tempo, mechanical rhythmic approach, and equal stress to all subintervals; American violinist Sol Babitz considered it "sewing machine" style with limited flexibility. American musician Robert Hill also commented on the predictably regular beat characteristic of Modernism; he describes a trade-off, in that "we compensate our lack of timing flexibility by a very highly developed sense of tone-color and dynamic which, however refined and polished it may be, tends to abstract and de-personalize the music-making, underscoring its absoluteness". He also notes this as having changed greatly from the "standard" classical repertoire of the 19th century.

In the early 19th century, the metronome was not used for ticking all through a piece, but only to check the tempo and then set it aside. This is in great contrast with many musicians today, who use the metronome in the background for the entirety of a piece of music.

Some writers draw parallels between a modern society that is "ordered by the clock" and what they see as metronomic performance practice of today's musicians.

While this section highlights the modern trends of strict mechanical performance as something widespread in the 20th century and now, as early as 1860, some people advocated this type of "modern" performance practice. While some in the 19th century welcomed the metronome, others were critical (see below).

Criticism
Changes in aesthetics or in the instruments themselves can easily make speeds indicated earlier problematic, which may explain why many notable nineteenth-century composers including Felix Mendelssohn, Richard Wagner, Giuseppe Verdi, and Johannes Brahms  criticized use of the metronome.

A metronome only provides a fixed, rigid, continuous pulse. Therefore, metronome markings on sheet music provide a reference, but cannot accurately communicate the pulse, swing, or groove of music. The pulse is often irregular, e.g., in accelerando, rallentando, or in musical expression as in phrasing (rubato, etc.).

Some argue that a metronomic performance stands in conflict with an expressive culturally-aware performance of music, so that a metronome a very limited tool in this respect. Even such highly rhythmical musical forms as samba, if performed in correct cultural style, cannot be captured with the beats of a metronome; the steady beat of a metronome neglects the characteristic swing of samba. A style of performance that is unfailingly regular rhythmically might be criticized as being metronomic.

Others argue that the metronome has no musical value, instead costing creativity and hurting the sense of rhythm in musicians rather than helping it. The use of a metronome has been compared to the difference between mechanically-aided and freehand drawing, in that the output with a metronome is said to be rigid and lacking creativity. Similarly, the controllable constant speed and rigid repetition of a metronome has been described as possibly costing internal rhythm and musicality when abused or overused. This contrasts with those who advocate its use as a training tool and exercises to cultivate a sense of rhythm.

American composer and critic Daniel Gregory Mason wrote that the use of the metronome is "dangerous" because it leads musicians to play by the measure or beat instead of the phrase, at the expense of liveliness, instinct, and rhythmical energy. He references that "good performances" commonly feature retardations and accelerations, in contrast to the steady beat of a metronome. This opinion has also been expressed by music teachers; for example, teacher Jennifer Merry relates the steady beat of a metronome to the structure of contemporary popular music, and says that both factors hinder understanding of rhythm and tempo in young children. These criticisms emphasize the importance of intuition, nuances, and style, rather than the rigid, steady beat of a metronome.

Metronome technique

Metronome technique is extensive and has been the subject of several books. This section summarizes some of the main ideas and approaches.  The "intuitive" approach to metronome practice is to simply play along with a metronome. With metronome technique, musicians do separate exercises to strengthen and steady their sense of rhythm and tempo, and increase their sensitivity to musical time and precision.

Playing "in the pocket"

The basic skill required is the ability to play precisely in the pocket—that is, exactly on the click of the metronome—with the metronome in a relaxed fashion. It helps musicians instil a more accurate sense of time clearly and precisely, at intervals corresponding to fractions of a second. One challenge with this approach, especially for pianists and percussionists, is the metronome click seeming to vanish (or at least be heard less distinctly) when one hits the click exactly. Musicians who attempt to play in the pocket with a metronome without established technique may find that it introduces tension and effort into their instrument technique.

To address these difficulties, musicians start by learning to play consistently ahead or behind the beat whenever they want to. As a result, they develop a clear sense of "where the click is" and can train to hit the click as well.

Musicians also listen to how the sound of their playing merges with the metronome to create a new sound when playing precisely in the pocket. Various approaches suggest that by listening in this way (and through other exercises), it is possible to play precisely in the pocket with the metronome in a relaxed fashion. While learning how to play in the pocket, musicians also work on flexibility and the ability to play precisely anywhere in the beat (as in more complex rhythms).

Precision of timing and sensitivity to musical time

Much of modern metronome technique involves various methods to help resolve timing problems. It aims to encourage and develop a clear sense of musical time and to help with the nuances and precision of timing, but at the same time must avoid creating overdependence on the metronome. Many exercises are used to help with precision of timing and sensitivity to time, such as maintaining the beat (staying in time) while the metronome is silent for longer periods of time, and playing displaced clicks or polyrhythms over the metronome.

Musically expressive rhythms

Modern metronome technique addresses expressive musical rhythms in many ways. For instance, much of the focus of modern metronome technique is on encouraging and developing a solid sense of tempo and timing, in both thinking and playing; as a result, one will be more rhythmically conscious.

Special metronome exercises are used to help keep this fluid sense of rhythm and timing when working with the metronome. Some commonly referenced exercises include drifting gradually from one beat to the next, playing beats ahead or behind the click (to become comfortable with playing anywhere relative to the metronome click), and starting from a pulse unison before gradually pushing notes ahead of the click and then pulling back again to pulse unison (or conversely, first pulling behind the pulse).

Author Andrew Lewis stated that one can also develop a higher level of awareness of the many natural rhythms in their everyday life, and use exercises to help bring those rhythms into their music. Likewise, author Mac Santiago emphasizes that use of a metronome helps to improve one's sense of time and exact timing without causing any of the expected problems for musicality and expressive timing, and rhythm itself is natural to human beings (though an exact sense of the passage of time is not) but must be trained for use in music. Santiago's book states:

Lewis also says in his book that increasing sensitivity to rhythm is essential to develop greater precision of timing and a clearer sense of the passage of musical time—relative to which musicians can then use expressive, natural and fluid rhythms, with as much rubato and tempo variance as they wish for. Lewis' book states:

Alternatives to metronome use
 
If a musician decides not to use a metronome, other methods are required to deal with timing and tempo glitches, and rushing and dragging. These ideas may also be useful as a complementary approach along with metronome technique.

Humans rely on a sense of rhythm to perform ordinary activities such as walking, running, hammering nails or chopping vegetables. Even speech and thought have a rhythm of sorts. According to author Andrew Lewis, one way to work on rhythms is to work on bringing these into music, becoming a "rhythm antenna". Until the 19th century in Europe, people used to sing as they worked, in time to the rhythms of their work. Musical rhythms were part of daily life; English musician Cecil Sharp collected some of these songs before they were forgotten. (See also work song and sea shanties.) In many parts of the world, music remains an important part of daily life. There are many accounts of people (especially tribal people) who sing frequently and spontaneously in their daily life, as they work, and as they engage in other activities. For example:

Musicians may also work on strengthening their sense of pulse using inner sources, such as breath and subdividing breaths, or instead work with the imagination, imagining a pulse. They may also work with their heart beat, and rhythms in their chest muscles in the same way. Another thing they do is to play music in their mind's ear along with the rhythms of walking or other daily life rhythms. Other techniques include hearing music in one's mind first before playing it. Musicians can deal with timing and tempo glitches by learning to hear a perfect performance in their mind first.

In some styles of music, such as early music notes inégales (according to one minority view interpretation), it can be appropriate to use a different approach that does not work so much with a sense of inner pulse, but rather works on ideas of gestures and is more closely related to rhythms of speech and poetry.

Some ideas are given by Marianne Ploger and Keith Hill in The Craft of Musical Communication. They state that notes should be subtly unequal—having no three notes the same helps to keep the music alive and interesting, in contrast to something that could be perceived as rigid and monotonous, and helps prevent any feeling of sameness and boredom in the music— the idea of "Entasis". Notes and musical phrases can also be organized in gestures—particular patterns of rhythm that come naturally—rather than strict measures. Another alternative is delaying individual notes, such as waiting slightly longer to play the notes expected at the end of a musical phrase, building anticipation. Additionally, notes played together can be allowed to go somewhat out of time with each other in a care-free fashion "sans souci"—this can create a feeling of "relaxed effortlessness" when notes are deliberately played irregularly (compared to what is notated in the score).

This is a minority view on interpretation of this style of music, but noteworthy because of its different approach to musical time and rhythm, and its relevance to the way rhythms can be practised. The more generally accepted view is that notes inégales were played with the same amount of swing nearly all the time, like modern jazz.

See also
Beat (music)
Oscillator

References

External links

 Research by Alexander Evan Bonus
The Metronomic Performance Practice: A History of Rhythm, Metronomes, and the Mechanization of Musicality; PhD Thesis by Alexander E. Bonus (May 2010)
A Timely Musical Discourse, or A Music Treatise from Lost Times, Part I (Current Musicology, (95)) by Alexander E. Bonus (March 2013)
Metronome (Oxford Handbooks Online) by Alexander E. Bonus (April 2014)
Maelzel, the Metronome, and the Modern Mechanics of Musical Time (The Oxford Handbook of Time in Music) by Alexander E. Bonus (December 2021)

Beethoven's Tempo Indications, PhD Thesis by Marten Noorduin (July 2016)

Pendulums
1815 introductions
Rhythm and meter
Articles containing video clips